Dale & Patricia Keller are American interior designers, recognized for their work in the fields of architecture and interior designer. Dale Allen Keller (1929-2016) was the founder of Dale Keller & Associates Ltd. Pte, previously based in Hong Kong, New York City, and London. They also operated an office in Athens, Greece for a time.

Dale and Patricia Keller were respectively the president and chief designer of Dale Keller & Assiociates, Inc. They built up the world's largest interior design firm specializing in the hospitality industry. Since the mid-1950s they have worked on a range of major projects in China, Japan, Hong Kong, Malaysia, Singapore, Thailand, India, Pakistan, Philippines, Middle East and worldwide.

After they designed the Marunouchi Hotel, Okura Hotel, Tokyo Hilton in Japan, followed by the Hong Kong Hilton, they were acknowledged as the world's experts high-end modern hotel design. They rode the wave of new hotel construction after World War II, mostly in Asia and later in the Middle East.

They were considered the giants in the field of hotel design for many years. They focused on hospitality interiors, which also included some work on night clubs. Projects that gave them a lot of personal satisfaction were the restoration of the Taj Mahal Hotel, Bombay, and the Manila Hotel, Philippines. Both buildings were on the brink of demolition. The Kellers were able to convince the public that the beautiful buildings could again be viable commercial entities. Most of the Kellers work was in the modernist vein, but what they were known for was bringing a sense of carefully studied cultural identity to their projects.
They won the Lifetime Achievement Award in 1999 for their contribution to hospitality design.

They retired to Bellevue, Washington.

Biography
Dale Keller was born on March 13, 1929, in Seattle, United States. Before graduating from University of Washington majoring in Interior Design under Professor Hope Lucille Foote, he decided to study architecture at the University of Tokyo in 1953 under Kenzō Tange where he studied the history of Japanese and Chinese architecture. He had studied the Japanese language for a year in Washington in preparation. He said that becoming fluent in Japanese came to him relatively easily.

Patricia Keller was born on May 18, 1926. She also graduated from University of Washington majoring in Interior Design under Professor Hope Lucille Foote. After graduation, Patricia Keller had her own business. She worked for different several major designers – Arthur Morgan in Seattle, Raymond Loewy in Paris Bernadotte and Bjorn in Copenhagen. She was accepted as a student in Copenhagen's furniture academy. In 1956, she met Dale in Tokyo while on a round-the-world tour. She speaks French.

Dale and Patricia Keller married and the couple had two sons: Mark Keller (born in Tokyo) and Andrew Keller (born in Hong Kong).

1962 - Dale Keller establish his 1st design firm in Hong Kong, Dale Keller & Associates Ltd. He worked alongside Patricia Keller as Chief Designer in the firm, at various times having as many as 30 staff members. The office staff were mostly trained as architects. Their office was a multinational business, with people coming to them from across Asia.

Works
1954 - Dale Keller's first job was collaborating with Bill Shrauger on Pacific House. It was a design and sales organization set up to design and manufacture in the country that exported many characteristic items.

1954 - Dale and Patricia early design works were mostly factories, banks, and offices for an oil company. These included National Cash Register Factory in Japan and Fuji Bank in Japan.
 
1961 - The first job together for Patricia and Dale Keller was the Marunouchi Hotel - Tokyo, followed soon after by the Okura Hotel and the Tokyo Hilton.

1961 - Listed as number one in interior design magazine list of Giants in Hotel Design

1965 - Appointed for first luxury resort to be built in Asia (Bali Hyatt – Sanur beach Indonesia which won many design awards). 

1976 – Opening of restored and expanded Manila Hotel. It won many awards worldwide. 

The Kellers were invited to design the interior of a new palace in Brunei by the sultan. The palace is listed in the Guinness World Records as the largest palace in the world.

1972 - The Kellers study Chinese rug production in China

1979 - They designed the first modern hotel in China – Fragrant Hill. For the first three years, they worked with I.M.Pei architects to create the Chinese-style hotel built around the remains of a garden built for Kangxi Emperor in the 1700s.

High point of their career – The Aman  and the Four season Resort in Bali. They were able to put in their long experience and love for Balinese culture.
S
Keller's worked as design consultants to help create the prince Maurice resort, Mauritius and the Lemura resort and golf hotel in the Seychellas.

1999 – they won the 1999 lifetime achievement award as hotel designers. The award was presented to them at a gala dinner at the Dorchester Hotel in London on December 6, 1999.

Below are lists of work done by Dale Keller & Assiociates Inc. :

HOTEL INTERIOR DESIGN PROJECTS

RESIDENTIAL PROJECTS

Dale Keller ( Design Consultant )

OFFICE & FINANCIAL SECTOR PROJECTS

OTHER COMPLETED DESIGN PROJECTS

Collaborations 

Dale Keller & Associates Ltd.Pte was set up as a pure design firm and their staffs are usually architect-trained rather than interior designers. Dale and Patricia Keller would bring along their staff to work with various architects such as:

- I. M. Pei & Associates

- Kerry Hill

- Grounds Kent Architects 

- Leandro Locsin

- Ildefonso P. Santos, Jr.

- Skidmore, Owings & Merrill

- Der Scutt 

- Palmer & Turner 

- Novotny und Mähner 

- Gruzen & Partners

Conclusion
Dale and Patricia Keller can justly claim to have pioneered modern hospitality design in Asia and, since the mid-1950s they have worked with different architects on various major projects at China, Japan, Hong Kong, Malaysia, Singapore, Thailand, India, Pakistan and the Philippines, and eventually expanding into the Middle East and worldwide. Instead of utilizing standardized interior furniture, furnishings and finishes in their interiors, they explored and researched each place's culture to create spaces with customized identities with the help of local people, workmen and artisans.
Dale Keller was responsible for encouraging PATA to establish a Pacific Asia Heritage Society to actively pursue the protection and preservation of Asian landmarks, culture and living national treasures. This has now become the PATA Foundation which actively sponsors seminars in various Asian countries and gives scholarships to worthy individuals. Although the Kellers had retired and Dale Kellers & Associates had been shut down but they provide consultation to the Mayor of Suzhou, China, and architect I.M.Pei, advising on the restoration of the old city and the development of the new that was mention in the Article " Lifetime Achievement 1999".

References

External links
Dale Allen Keller's Biography
Patricia Keller's Biography
Dale Keller & Associates Ltd's Info
Dale Keller & Associates Ltd's Careers
"2006 Kerry Hill - RAIA Gold Medallist." 
Four Season Resort
Fragrant Hill Hotel
Gran Hotel La Florida Official Website
Four Seasons Resort Bali
Manila Hotel Official Website

American interior designers